Peter Kersten (born 1 February 1958) is a German former rower who competed in the 1980 Summer Olympics.

References

1958 births
Living people
Olympic rowers of East Germany
Rowers at the 1980 Summer Olympics
Olympic bronze medalists for East Germany
Olympic medalists in rowing
East German male rowers
Medalists at the 1980 Summer Olympics
World Rowing Championships medalists for East Germany